is a Japanese serial novel and manga written by Kunihiko Ikuhara. The serial novel was published in the teenage fashion magazine  from 2006 to 2007 as "Part 1", while a manga written by Ikuhara and illustrated Asumiko Nakamura was published from 2007 to 2017 as "Part 2". A sequel manga series, Nokemono to Hanayome+ (ノケモノと花嫁|+, "+" pronounced "cross"), was serialized on the digital distribution platform Comic Boost from 2018 to 2020.

Synopsis
Described by publisher Comic Boost as a "lolita hardboiled" series, Nokemono to Hanayome is set in a world ruled by the "Moeru Kirin", a group of teenagers who dress in animal costumes. The series follows the relationship between Hitsuji Sera, the series' titular bride, and Itaru Hagumazuka, a boy who wears a bear costume.

Development
Ikuhara developed a pitch for an anime adaptation of Nokemono to Hanayome from 2005 to 2006. The adaptation, titled Nokemono to Hanayome+, would ultimately not transpire, with Ikuhara opting to instead publish the story as a sequel manga in 2018. The series is regarded as a precursor to several of Ikuhara's later anime series, with animal costume elements from Nokemono to Hanayome appearing in Yurikuma Arashi; Nokemono to Hanayome is also inspired by the Tokyo subway sarin attack, which appears as a central plot element in Ikuhara's Penguindrum.

Media
Nokemono to Hanayome was published in the fashion magazine  as a serial novel from 2006 to 2007, and as a manga from 2007 to 2017. Beginning in 2018, the sequel series Nokemono to Hanayome+ began serialization on the digital distribution platform Denshi Birz (renamed Comic Boost in 2019), with new chapters published every other month. The series concluded in April 2020.

References

External links
 
 Nokemono to Hanayome at Comic Boost

2006 novels
2007 manga
Gentosha manga
Lolita fashion
Shōjo manga